The Caribbean Postal Union (CPU) is an association of the postal authorities of the following member countries:

  Anguilla (Anguilla Postal Service)
  Antigua and Barbuda (Antigua Post Office)
  Aruba (Post Aruba)
  Bahamas (Bahamas Postal Service)
  Barbados (Barbados Postal Service)
  Belize (Belize Postal Service)
  Bermuda (Bermuda Post Office)
  British Virgin Islands (BVI Post)
  Canada (Canada Post)
  Caribbean Netherlands‡ (Nieuwe Post Nederlandse Antillen)
  Bonaire
  Sint Eustatius
  Saba
  Cayman Islands (Cayman Islands Postal Service)
  Cuba (Groupo Empresarial Corres de Cuba)
  Curaçao (Cpost International) 
  Dominica (General Post Office - GPO) 

  Dominican Republic (Instituto Postal Dominicano - INPOSDOM)
  France (La Poste)
  Grenada (Grenada Postal Corporation)
  Guyana (Guyana Post Office Corporation)
  Haiti (Post of Haiti Office/Office des Postes d'Haïti)
  Jamaica (Jamaica Postal Corporation)
  Montserrat (Montserrat Postal Service)
  Netherlands (PostNL)
  Saint Christopher (Saint Kitts) and Nevis (St. Kitts & Nevis Postal Services)
  Saint Lucia (Saint Lucia Postal Service)
  Sint Maarten (Postal Services St. Maarten N.V. - PSS)
  Saint Vincent and the Grenadines (SVG Postal Corporation)
  Suriname (Suriname Postal Corporation)
  Trinidad and Tobago (T&T Postal Corporation - TTPOST)
  Turks and Caicos Islands (TCI Postal and Philatelic Bureau Services)
  United Kingdom (Royal Mail Group plc)
  United States (United States Postal Service)

Note ‡ − Since October 10, 2010, the Netherlands Antilles does not exist any more as a country per outcome of referendum. Curaçao and Sint Maarten have become countries just like Aruba and the Netherlands proper. The three islands Bonaire, Sint Eustatius and Saba (the "BES islands") have become "special municipalities" of the Netherlands.

It was founded in 1997 as a restricted union of the Universal Postal Union.

It is headquartered in Castries, Saint Lucia.

See also 
 British West Indies
 Dutch West Indies
 French West Indies
 CARIFORUM
 Association of Caribbean States (ACS)
 African, Caribbean and Pacific Group of States (ACP)
 United Nations Postal Administration
 Postal Union of the Americas, Spain and Portugal
 European Conference of Postal and Telecommunications Administrations (CEPT)

References

External links 
 
 Correct address 2011 - UPU Member Countries Addressing Structure, scribd.com

Postal organizations
Universal Postal Union
Organizations established in 1997
Organisations based in Saint Lucia
Castries